The Day of the Jackal is a 1973 British/French international co-production political thriller film directed by Fred Zinnemann and starring Edward Fox and Michael Lonsdale. Based on the 1971 novel of the same name by Frederick Forsyth, the film is about a professional assassin known only as the "Jackal" who is hired to assassinate French president Charles de Gaulle in the summer of 1962.

The Day of the Jackal received positive reviews and went on to win the BAFTA Award for Best Editing (Ralph Kemplen), five additional BAFTA Award nominations, two Golden Globe Award nominations, and one Oscar nomination. The film grossed $16,056,255 at the North American box office, returning $8,525,000 in rentals to the studio. The British Film Institute ranked it the 74th greatest British film of the 20th century.

Plot
On 22 August 1962, the militant underground organisation OAS, infuriated by the French government granting independence to Algeria, attempt to assassinate President Charles de Gaulle. The assassination attempt fails, leaving de Gaulle and his entire entourage unharmed. Within six months, OAS leader Jean Bastien-Thiry and several other members are captured and Bastien-Thiry is executed.

The remaining OAS leaders, now hiding in Austria, plan another attempt, and hire a British assassin, who goes by the code name, "Jackal", for $500,000. The Jackal travels to Genoa and commissions a custom-made rifle from a gunsmith, and fake identity papers from a forger, whom the Jackal kills when the man tries blackmailing him. In Paris, the Jackal duplicates a key to a flat overlooking the Place du 18 juin 1940.

The OAS relocate to Rome. The French Action Service kidnap the OAS's chief clerk, Viktor Wolenski. Wolenski dies under interrogation, but not before the agents extract vital information about the plot, including the word "Jackal". The Interior Minister convenes a secret cabinet meeting of the heads of the French security forces. Police Commissioner Berthier recommends his deputy, Claude Lebel, to lead the investigation. Lebel is given special emergency powers, though de Gaulle's refusal to change his planned public appearances complicates matters.

Colonel St. Clair, a personal military aide to de Gaulle and a cabinet member, carelessly discloses classified government information to his mistress, Denise, unaware she is an OAS agent. She passes this on to her contact, which, in turn, aids the Jackal. Meanwhile, Lebel determines that British suspect Charles Calthrop may be travelling under the name Paul Oliver Duggan, who died as a child, and has entered France.

Although the Jackal learns the authorities have uncovered the assassination plot, he decides to proceed. While at a hotel, the Jackal meets and seduces the aristocratic Colette de Montpellier. Warned by his contact, the Jackal leaves just before Lebel and his men arrive. After a nearly fatal vehicular accident, the Jackal steals a car and drives to Madame de Montpellier's country estate to hide out. He kills her after discovering the police have already spoken to her. Using a stolen passport, the Jackal then assumes the identity of a bespectacled Danish schoolteacher named Per Lundquist. After disposing of Duggan's belongings in a river, he catches a train for Paris.

Madame de Montpellier's body is discovered and her car is recovered at the railway station. Lebel, no longer hindered by secrecy restrictions, launches a public manhunt. The Jackal picks up a gay man at a Turkish bathhouse and stays at the man's flat. The Jackal kills him after the man sees a TV news broadcast that "Lundquist" is wanted for murder.

At a meeting with the Interior Minister's cabinet, Lebel says he believes the Jackal will attempt to shoot de Gaulle during the commemoration of the liberation of Paris during World War II, scheduled three days hence. Lebel plays a recording of a phone call in which St. Clair's mistress, Denise, is heard providing information to an OAS contact. St. Clair apologises for his indiscretion and immediately leaves. When asked how he knew St. Clair was the source of the leak, Lebel says he wiretapped every cabinet member's phone. Denise returns to St. Clair's apartment and discovers that he has committed suicide and finds the police are waiting for her.

On Liberation Day, the Jackal, disguised as an elderly veteran amputee on crutches, enters a building using the key he had earlier procured. In an upper apartment overlooking the ceremonial area, he assembles the rifle hidden within his crutch and waits by the window. When Lebel discovers that a policeman allowed a disabled man to pass through the security cordon, the two race to the building. As de Gaulle presents the first medal, the Jackal takes aim but as he shoots he narrowly misses when the president suddenly leans forward. As he reloads the rifle for another shot, Lebel and the policeman burst in. The Jackal shoots the policeman, but Lebel kills him using the officer's submachine gun.

The Jackal is buried in an unmarked grave, with Lebel as the only witness. In England, while police are searching Charles Calthrop's flat, the real Calthrop suddenly arrives. He accompanies them to Scotland Yard and is later cleared. Inspector Thomas then asks who the Jackal really was.

Cast

 Edward Fox as the Jackal, also known as Paul Duggan & Per Lundquist
 Michel Lonsdale as Deputy Commissioner Claude Lebel
 Terence Alexander as Lloyd
 Michel Auclair as Colonel Rolland
 Alan Badel as the French Interior Minister
 Tony Britton as Superintendent Brian Thomas
 Derek Jacobi as Caron
 Denis Carey as Casson
 Cyril Cusack as the Gunsmith
 Maurice Denham as General Colbert
 Delphine Seyrig as Colette de Montpellier
 Jacques François as Pascal
 Olga Georges-Picot as Denise
 Raymond Gérôme as Flavigny
 Barrie Ingham as St. Clair
 Jean Martin as Victor Wolenski
 Ronald Pickup as the Forger
 Vernon Dobtcheff as the Interrogator
 Eric Porter as Col. Marc Rodin
 Anton Rodgers as Jules Bernard
 Donald Sinden as Assistant Commissioner Mallinson
 Jean Sorel as Jean Bastien-Thiry
 David Swift as Montclair
 Timothy West as Commissioner Berthier
 Bernard Archard as Inspector Hughes
 Philippe Léotard as Paris Gendarme
 Adrien Cayla-Legrand as President Charles de Gaulle
 Edward Hardwicke as Charles Calthrop (uncredited)
 Howard Vernon as Minister Levesque (uncredited)
 David Kernan as the real Per Lindquist (uncredited)
 Féodor Atkine as an OAS member (uncredited)
 Max Faulkner as a Special Branch Inspector (uncredited)
 Liliane Rovère as Hotel Chambermaid (uncredited)

Production
The Day of the Jackal was originally part of a two-picture deal between John Woolf and Fred Zinnemann, the other being an adaptation of the play Abelard and Heloise by Ronald Millar.

Universal Studios initially wanted to cast a major American actor as the Jackal, with Robert Redford and Jack Nicholson flown to Europe to audition. Although Universal favoured Nicholson, Zinnemann ultimately secured a production agreement stipulating that only European actors would be cast. Afterwards British actors David McCallum, Ian Richardson, and Michael York were considered before Zinnemann cast Edward Fox. Jacqueline Bisset was offered the role of Denise but had to decline due to scheduling conflicts.

Zinnemann wrote that Adrien Cayla-Legrand, the actor who played de Gaulle, was mistaken by several Parisians for the real de Gaulle during filming—though de Gaulle had been dead for two years prior to the film's release. The sequence was filmed during a real parade, leading to confusion; the crowd (many of whom were unaware that a film was being shot) mistook the actors portraying police officers for real officers, and many tried to help them arrest the "suspects" they were apprehending in the crowd.

The Day of the Jackal was filmed in studios and on location in France, Britain, Italy and Austria. Zinnemann was able to film in locations usually denied to filmmakers—such as inside the Ministry of the Interior—due in large part to French producer Julien Derode's skill in dealing with authorities. Nevertheless, the opening sequence was not shot in the Élysée courtyard but at the hôtel de Soubise, main office of the French National Archives. The two palaces were both built at the beginning of the 18th century, but the Hôtel de Soubise is more accessible and has less security than the Élysée.

During the massive annual 14 July parade down the Champs-Élysées, the company was allowed to film inside the police lines, capturing extraordinary closeup footage of the massing of troops, tanks, and artillery during the final Liberation Day sequence. During the weekend of 15 August, the Paris police cleared a very busy square of all traffic to film additional scenes.

Frederick Forsyth later wrote that for the film contract to buy rights for his novel, he was offered two options: £17,500 plus a small percentage of subsequent film profits, or £20,000 and no royalties. He took £20,000, noting that such a payment was already a massive sum to him, but due to his naivety about finances he waived rights to a small fortune in royalties given the film's enduring success.

List of locations

Reception

Critical response 

The film received positive reviews, with a 90% rating on Rotten Tomatoes from 29 reviews. Among those who praised the film was Roger Ebert of the Chicago Sun-Times, who gave it his highest rating of four stars, writing:

Ebert concluded, "Zinnemann has mastered every detail ... There are some words you hesitate to use in a review, because they sound so much like advertising copy, but in this case I can truthfully say that the movie is spellbinding." Ebert included the film at No. 7 on his list of the Top 10 films of the year for 1973.

The Day of the Jackal and the resultant Academy Award nomination were career milestones for Kenneth Ross, the Scottish-American screenwriter.  Critics were generally favorably impressed with the film. 
The paternity of the film is somewhat disputed. The screenplay faithfully adheres to the novel, even as the latter is uncredited in the film.  “This is not a bad movie, it races by and entertains, after a fashion. It simply is not as good as it should have been.”
Roger Ebert noted the synergy of the screenplay, direction, and acting:"Fred Zinnemann’s “The Day of the Jackal” is one hell of an exciting movie. I wasn’t prepared for how good it really is: it’s not just a suspense classic, but a beautifully executed example of filmmaking. It’s put together like a fine watch. The screenplay meticulously assembles an incredible array of material, and then Zinnemann choreographs it so that the story—complicated as it is—unfolds in almost documentary starkness.“The Day of the Jackal” is two and a half hours long and seems over in about fifteen minutes. There are some words you hesitate to use in a review, because they sound so much like advertising copy, but in this case I can truthfully say that the movie is spellbinding."
The TIME film critic appreciated the transition from novel to film:
The Day of the Jackal makes one appreciate anew the wonderful narrative efficiency of the movies. Frederick Forsyth's bestselling novel—essentially what mystery buffs call a police procedural, but blown up to international proportions—kept losing its basically simple story line in the forest of words.
The writer required paragraphs to detail the procedures of an international man hunt, not to mention the procedures of the Jackal himself, a hired gun employed by disaffected French army officers to assassinate Charles de Gaulle.
This is the kind of material that a good director can give us in the wink of a panning camera's eye.”  Due to the masterful cinema and cutting skills of director Fred Zinnemann “what might have been just another expensive entertainment becomes, on a technical level, a textbook on reels in the near-forgotten subject of concise moviemaking. In short, as so often happens, a second-rate fiction has been transformed into a first-rate screen entertainment.
Other critics were less effusive.  For example:
“Day Of The Jackal is not a great film, but it’s a damn good one, one of the very few films released this year that is worth all the trouble and expense of going out to the movies. ...  give [director Zinnemann]  a good yarn and he tells it without any personal intrusions and attention-getting tics. Jackal is an authentically detailed suspense story with ingenious twists.  And you may be surprised, for director Fred (“High Noon”) Zinnemann and adapter Kenneth Ross have made a curiously depersonalized kind of suspense flick of Frederick Forsyth’s best seller. ..."  The script highlights in a suspenseful way the conflict between a relentless “killer’s brain” and the stolid and relentless work of detectives on the hunt for an unknown and elusive quarry.
MacLeans Magazine’s critic called it: “.. an authentically detailed suspense story with ingenious twists. “
The movie is an intricate and detailed maze, but is entertaining and never tedious.
The interplay between director and author was favorably noted:
"Author Frederick Forsyth struck gold right out of the gate with his first fictional work, the 1971 international bestseller The Day of the Jackal, and then had the good fortune to watch it transformed into a motion picture that (unlike too many page-to-screen efforts) steadfastly avoided botching the source material. A largely faithful adaptation of Forsyth’s novel, .... Fred Zinnemann, scripter Kenneth Ross, and editor Ralph Kemplen (earning this film’s sole Oscar nomination) all deserve high marks for ratcheting up the tension in a movie whose outcome is never in doubt (after all, de Gaulle died years later at home, at the age of 79)."
Likewise, the film critic for The Spectator opined:"All of this the cinema is properly and effectively equipped to handle. Zinnemann, with the help of an excellent script from Kenneth Ross, has transferred the novel lock, stock, barrel and silencer to the screen. Nothing important has been left out. ..... [The script and the film conveys, the action, conflict, place and denouement. Making it a] “documentary thriller is that it leaves nothing to the imagination.'  In other words, for those of you who have read the novel, going to The Day of the Jackal will be curiously like the experience of seeing the same film a second time round or seeing the filmed version of a stage play. For anyone who hasn't read Forsyth's book, the film can be recommended wholeheartedly."
The scrupulously researched “pulp thriller” provided “ the perfect template for this exhaustive procedural. In many ways, this outstanding piece of filmmaking marks the apotheosis of a certain style of thriller that has since fallen out of fashion—the mind game. [It is] “Built with the minutiae of a Swiss watch”, without blandishments.  The linear plot “ is made infinitely complex by the portrayal of this empty vessel of a killer by Fox. ...”  An irresistible force is pitted against an immovable object—a conflict facilitated by the script.  There is an intricate story “with a parallel structure that details the Jackal's preparations for the assassination” and the prophylactic efforts of the detectives.

The Japanese filmmaker Akira Kurosawa cited this movie as one of his 100 favorite films.

Box office
The film grossed $16,056,255 at the box office earning North American rentals of $8,525,000. Zinnemann was pleased with the film's reception at the box office, telling an interviewer in 1993, "The idea that excited me was to make a suspense film where everybody knew the end - that de Gaulle was not killed. In spite of knowing the end, would the audience sit still? And it turned out that they did, just as the readers of the book did."

Awards and nominations

Subsequent films 
The film was the inspiration for the 1997 American film The Jackal, featuring Richard Gere, Bruce Willis, Sidney Poitier and Jack Black. The 1997 film is about an assassin nicknamed The Jackal who wants to assassinate a highly significant target, but other than that, it has little in common with the original story. Frederick Forsyth refused to allow his name to be used in connection with it, and director Fred Zinnemann fought with the studio to ensure that the new film did not share the first film's title.

In 1988, the same plot inspired the Malayalam movie August 1.

See also
 BFI Top 100 British films

References

Notes

Citations

External links
 
 
 
 

1973 films
1970s political thriller films
1970s thriller drama films
British political thriller films
French thriller drama films
Films scored by Georges Delerue
Films about assassinations
Films about contract killing
Films based on British novels
Films based on works by Frederick Forsyth
Films directed by Fred Zinnemann
Films set in 1962
Films set in 1963
Films set in France
Films set in Paris
Films shot at Pinewood Studios
Political thriller films
Universal Pictures films
Films about secret societies
Fiction about the Organisation armée secrète
Cultural depictions of Charles de Gaulle
Films shot in France
Films shot in Italy
Films shot in the United Kingdom
Films shot in Austria
Films set in London
English-language French films
1973 drama films
Algerian War films
Films set in Austria
Films set in Genoa
Films set in Rome
Films shot in Vienna
Films shot in Nice
Films shot in Paris
Films shot in Île-de-France
Films shot at Boulogne Studios
Films shot in London
1970s English-language films
1970s British films
1970s French films

ja:ジャッカルの日#映画化